Agathangelus is the latinized form of the Greek name Agathangelos.

Agathangelus or Agathangelos is the name of:

Agathangelus of Rome (died 312), Christian martyr
Agathangelos ( 5th century CE), possibly a pseudonym, the biographer of Gregory the Illuminator
Agathangelus of Constantinople (1769–1832), Patriarch of Constantinople
Agathangelos Xirouchakis (1872–1958), Greek Orthodox cleric and historian
Agathangelos Tsiripidis (born 1963), Greek boxer

Masculine given names